OKC may refer to:
 Oklahoma City, the capital and largest city of the U.S. state of Oklahoma
 Oklahoma City Thunder, the city's National Basketball Association (NBA) team
 Will Rogers World Airport, the city's commercial airport (IATA abbreviation: OKC; ICAO abbreviation: KOKC)
 OkCupid, American online dating website
 Ontario Knife Company, Franklinville, New York
 Odontogenic keratocyst, a tumor in the jaw now referred to as "keratocystic odontogenic tumor"
 Open kinetic chain exercises, exercises that are performed where the hand or foot is free to move

See also 
Oklahoma City (disambiguation)